Tallulah Jessica Elina Hynes (née Stevenson; born 30 October 1972) is an English actress, director and writer. Known professionally as Jessica Stevenson until 2007, she was one of the creators, writers and stars of the British sitcom Spaced and has worked as a writer and actress for over two decades.

Hynes has been nominated for a Tony, a Laurence Olivier Award, five BAFTAs (winning two) and three British Comedy Awards (winning two).

Early life
Hynes was born in Lewisham, south London, and grew up in Brighton, where she attended St Luke's Infant and Junior Schools and Dorothy Stringer High School. After her parents split up, she was raised by her mother. She moved back to London as a young adult.

Career
As a teenager, Hynes was a member of the National Youth Theatre company, and made her stage début with the company in Lionel Bart's Blitz in 1990. In 1992–1993, she played a season at the West Yorkshire Playhouse, Leeds. In the same year, she appeared in Peter Greenaway's 1993 film The Baby of Mâcon, playing the first midwife. In 1994, Hynes appeared as an uncredited extra in the first episode of The Day Today in the Attitudes Night segment, a parody of the UK's changing attitudes.

Early in her career, Hynes teamed up with future Spaced co-star Katy Carmichael in a comedy double-act called the Liz Hurleys, appeared in two productions at Sheffield's Crucible Theatre, and acted for television shows like Staying Alive, Six Pairs of Pants, (Un)natural Acts, and Asylum (on which the Spaced team of Stevenson, Simon Pegg and Edgar Wright first assembled). She guest starred in the first episode of Midsomer Murders in 1997. From 1998 to 2000, Hynes played the supporting role of Cheryl in the hit sitcom The Royle Family; she reprised the role for special episodes in 2006, 2009 and 2010. In 1999, she co-wrote and starred in Spaced.

Her London theatre début was in April 2002, playing the tough ex-prisoner "Bolla" in Jez Butterworth's The Night Heron at the Royal Court. In 2004, she played a minor part as Yvonne in horror comedy Shaun of the Dead, again working with Pegg and Wright. In the same year, she was also cast as Magda, friend of the titular character, in the Hollywood sequel Bridget Jones' Diary 2, also called Bridget Jones' Diary: The Edge of Reason. In 2005, Hynes took the lead role in the BBC One sitcom According to Bex (which she would later come to regret), and had a starring role in British comedy Confetti alongside Jimmy Carr, Martin Freeman and Mark Heap.

In early 2007, Hynes took a lead role in the film Magicians, starring alongside comic duo David Mitchell and Robert Webb. She provided the voice of Mafalda Hopkirk in Harry Potter and the Order of the Phoenix. Hynes played Joan Redfern in the 2007 Doctor Who episodes "Human Nature" and "The Family of Blood". She then appeared in part two of the story "The End of Time", playing a character named Verity Newman, who is Joan's great granddaughter. Hynes appeared in Big Finish's Eighth Doctor audio adventure "Invaders from Mars", with her Spaced colleague Simon Pegg. She starred in Son of Rambow (credited as Jessica Stevenson), playing Mary Proudfoot opposite the star of the film, Bill Milner. In November 2007, BBC One released Learners, a comedy drama television movie which Hynes starred in and wrote.

Hynes co-wrote the pilot Phoo Action, based on the cartoons of Jamie Hewlett, which was transmitted on BBC Three in early 2008. In the same year, Hynes appeared in the film Faintheart and in a revival of Alan Ayckbourn's The Norman Conquests at the Old Vic. In 2009 she made her Broadway début in the play's transfer and was nominated for a Tony Award for her performance. Hynes stated that she planned to pursue a solo career as a stand-up comedian and was working on a children's book, Ants in the Marmalade. Later that year, she returned to the Royal Court in The Priory, a new play by Michael Wynne.

Hynes appeared as a "right-on" PR person, Siobhan Sharpe, in the London Olympics centred satire Twenty Twelve, of which the first series screened on BBC Four in 2011, moving to BBC Two in spring 2012. A further series was screened in July 2012. She reprised the role in the 2014 series W1A for which she won a BAFTA. In October 2012, she released a duet with singer Anthony Strong of Slim Gaillard's Laughing in Rhythm. The following month, Hynes appeared in the film Nativity 2: Danger in the Manger, in which she plays competition host Angel Matthews. In December 2012 she appeared with co-star Hugh Bonneville in World's Most Dangerous Roads, travelling through Georgia.

In 2017 Hynes played the role of a medieval knight in the revival series of The Crystal Maze and Emmeline Pankhurst in the UK take of “Drunk History”. In the same year, Hynes directed her first feature film, The Fight, produced by Noel Clarke and Jason Maza. In 2018, Hynes played the role of a mother in the BBC Four programme There She Goes. She stars alongside David Tennant, raising a daughter with a severe learning disability. It is based on the real life of writer Shaun Pye, whose daughter was born with a chromosomal disorder. Also in 2018, she played the character of ‘Marv’ in the online series Jack and Dean of All Trades which ran for two seasons on Fullscreen and later the Jack and Dean YouTube channel following the closure of Fullscreen's video on-demand service. The following year in 2019, she starred in the BBC and HBO production Years and Years.

Personal life
Hynes is married to Adam Hynes, a sculptor. The couple have been together since they were 18 years old, but only married in 2007. They have three children together, and live in Folkestone, Kent. Before settling in Folkestone, Hynes lived between London and San Francisco.

She has a sister, Zoe, who works in fashion.

Filmography

Television

Film

Awards

References

External links

1972 births
Living people
20th-century English actresses
21st-century English actresses
Best Female Comedy Performance BAFTA Award (television) winners
Actresses from London
English women comedians
English television writers
English television actresses
English film actresses
English stage actresses
National Youth Theatre members
English voice actresses
Labour Party (UK) people
People from Lewisham
Actresses from Kent
People from Brighton
Women's Equality Party people
British women television writers